Leptomyrmecini is a tribe of Dolichoderinae ants with 16 genera and two extinct genera.

Genera
Anillidris Santschi, 1936
Anonychomyrma Donisthorpe, 1947
Azteca Forel, 1878
†Chronomyrmex McKellar, Glasier & Engel, 2013
Doleromyrma Forel, 1907
Dorymyrmex Mayr, 1866
Forelius Emery, 1888
Froggattella Forel, 1902
Gracilidris Wild & Cuezzo, 2006
Iridomyrmex Mayr, 1862
Leptomyrmex Mayr, 1862
Linepithema Mayr, 1866
Nebothriomyrmex Dubovikov, 2004
Ochetellus Shattuck, 1992
Papyrius Shattuck, 1992
Philidris Shattuck, 1992
Turneria Forel, 1895

References

Dolichoderinae
Ant tribes